MRQ is an acronym that may refer to:

 Marinduque Airport (IATA: MRQ)
 Marquesan language (ISO 639:mrq)
 Midalja għall-Qlubija, a Maltese medal of bravery whose post-nominal letters are M.R.Q.
 Modern Rock Quartet, a Canadian jazz-rock band
 most recent quarter, in a fiscal year

See also
 MRQE, Movie Review Query Engine
 MRQP, ICAO for Quepos La Managua Airport